Silene paradoxa, the Dover catchfly, is a species of flowering plant in the family Caryophyllaceae, native to southeastern France, Corsica, Italy, the former Yugoslavia, Albania, and Greece. It can grow on serpentine soils and copper mine tailings.

References

paradoxa
Flora of France
Flora of Corsica
Flora of Italy
Flora of Yugoslavia
Flora of Albania
Flora of Greece
Plants described in 1763
Taxa named by Carl Linnaeus